Lasting  (original title: Nieulotne) is a 2013 Polish drama film directed and written by Jacek Borcuch.

Plot
Lasting is an emotional love story about Michał and Karina, a pair of Polish students who meet and fall in love while working summer jobs in Spain. An unexpected nightmare brutally breaks into their carefree time in the heavenly landscape and throws their lives into chaos.

Cast
 Magdalena Berus as Karina
 Jakub Gierszał as Michał
 Ángela Molina as Elena
 Joanna Kulig as Marta
 Juanjo Ballesta as Joaquín
 Andrzej Chyra as Karina's father

Awards 
 Sundance Film Festival Cinematography Award – Michał Englert

References

External links 
 

2013 films
Polish drama films
2010s Polish-language films
2013 drama films